The Ian Healy Oval is a cricket ground in the suburb of Wooloowin in Brisbane, Australia, named after the former Australian international cricketer Ian Healy. In March 2021, it would have become a first-class cricket venue by hosting a match in the 2020–21 Sheffield Shield season, but the match was eventually abandoned due to rain. Prior to the 2021–22 Ashes series, the ground hosted a warm-up match between England and the England Lions.

References

Cricket grounds in Queensland
Multi-purpose stadiums in Australia